Dunvegan is a village on the Isle of Skye in Scotland. It is famous for Dunvegan Castle, seat of the chief of Clan MacLeod. Dunvegan is within the parish of Duirinish, and Duirinish Parish Church is at Dunvegan. In 2011 it had a population of 386.

Name
In The Norse Influence on Gaelic Scotland (1910), George Henderson suggests that the name Dùn Bheagain derives from Old Gaelic Dùn Bheccáin ([the] fort of Beccán), Beccán being a Gaelic personal name. Dùn Bheagain would not mean 'little fort' as this would be Dùn Beag in Gaelic.

Geography

Dunvegan sits on the shores of the large Loch Dunvegan, and the Old School Restaurant in the village is noted for its fish, caught freshly from the loch itself. Dunvegan is situated at the junction of the A850, and the A863. The B884 road also has a junction with the A863, at the eastern end of Dunvegan.

Demography
Dunvegan's permanent population is declining. However, numbers staying in the area during holidays have increased dramatically over the years since 2001.

Economy
Tourist information used to be situated in the parade of shops at Lochside, but is now available on a seasonal basis at Dunvegan Castle's St Kilda Shop. The Giant MacAskill Museum, which celebrates the life of Angus Mòr MacAskill was established in 1989 and is managed by Peter MacAskill, father of the street trials cycle rider Danny MacAskill.

References

External links 

Undiscovered Scotland - Dunvegan

Populated places in the Isle of Skye